Richard Tighe Harris (October 31, 1833 – October 11, 1907) was an Irish American miner and prospector.

Life
Richard Harris was born in Banbridge, County Down, Ireland. He then attended Girard College, a private boarding school in Philadelphia, Pennsylvania.

He is most famous for co-founding, with Joe Juneau, the city of Juneau, Alaska. The first major gold discovery in Juneau or Douglas Island (across from Juneau) was around 1880. It has been the political capital of Alaska since 1906.

His Native American guide in southeastern Alaska was Chief Kowee. Kowee is credited with discovering much of the Juneau area. Richard and Joe were sent with Kowee by George Pilz, an entrepreneur from Sitka. Harris and Juneau traded with the natives much of their grubstake for hoochinoo. When they returned to Pilz empty-handed, he sent them back to the Juneau area. There, Kowee took them beyond Gold Creek (which today flows beside the Hurff Ackerman Saunders Federal Building and Robert Boochever U.S. Courthouse) to Silver Bow Basin. Today, a creek on Douglas Island is named Kowee Creek.

After the discovery of gold in Juneau, Harris and Juneau loaded approximately 1,000 pounds of gold ore back to Sitka.

The town did not take its current name immediately; originally, it was known as Harrisburg, Pilzburg, and Rockwell. Juneau was able to buy votes from enough of his fellow miners for the name to be changed. Today, Harris Street still exists in Juneau. Harris lived most of the remainder of his life in Juneau; later he was moved to a nursing home in Oregon, where he died.

Both Harris and Juneau are buried in the city's Evergreen Cemetery.

Sources
 University of Alaska, Anchorage Archives

External links

Gold prospectors
American gold prospectors
People from County Down
1833 births
1907 deaths
Burials at Evergreen Cemetery (Juneau, Alaska)